Neve Ativ, is an Israeli settlement in the Golan Heights, organized as a small Alpine-styled moshav.

The international community considers Israeli settlements in the Golan Heights illegal under international law, but the Israeli government disputes this.

Ski resort
The moshav's main industry is tourism. Neve Ativ operates the nearby Mount Hermon ski resort, which has  of ski runs on the slopes of the -above-sea-level Mount Hermon. The resort was destroyed in the 1973 Yom Kippur War, but re-opened the following year.

History
Israel and Syria fought major battles in the area in 1967 and 1973, and it remains a strategic military position. Neve Ativ was built on the land of the destroyed Syrian village of Jubata ez-Zeit. It was founded in 1972, when the Golan region was a part of the Israeli Military Governorate, governed by military occupation system. The name Ativ is an acronym for four fallen soldiers from the Egoz Reconnaissance Unit killed in action in the Golan: Avraham Hameiri, Tuvia Ellinger, Yair Elegarnty, and Binyamin Hadad. Neve means Oasis.

In 1981, the area of Golan was unilaterally annexed by Israel, abolishing military occupation system and imposing Israeli civil rule on the area. In November 1996, a dining room in the settlement was set on fire and the walls on the building had "Down With the Occupation" and "The Golan Belongs to Syria" painted on them. Pro-Syrian Druze were believed to be behind it.

See also
 Economy of Israel
Tourism in Israel

References

Israeli settlements in the Golan Heights
Moshavim
Agricultural Union
Golan Regional Council
Populated places in Northern District (Israel)
Populated places established in 1972
1972 establishments in the Israeli Military Governorate